Torrijos, officially the Municipality of Torrijos, is a 3rd class municipality in the province of Marinduque, Philippines. According to the 2020 census, it has a population of 30,476 people.

History
On September 13, 1900, during the Philippine–American War an engagement in Torrijos pitted the forces of Philippine Revolutionary Army Colonel Maximo Abad against the Americans led by Captain Devereux Shields. Abad's men defeated the American force, it was one of the worst defeats suffered by the Americans during the war. This was known as the Battle of Pulang Lupa which took place in Torrijos. A monument now stands on the mountain where the battle took place, known as Pulang Lupa or "Red Mountain" due to the red soil.

In 1942, the Japanese occupied the town of Torrijos, Marinduque.

In 1945, in the Battle of Marinduque, American and Filipino troops fought in and around the town of Torrijos and Marinduque against the Japanese soldiers during World War II.

Geography

Barangays
Torrijos is politically subdivided into 25 barangays.

Climate

Demographics

Economy

Transportation
Access to the municipality:
 Via sea - Balanacan Port Mogpog (ferry coming from Lucena, ro/ro and fastcrafts)
 Via air - Marinduque Airport-(Cebu Pacific Operated by Cebgo) Manila-Marinduque Flight Starts Operation on April 1, 2019

Education

Tertiary

Marinduque State University
 Torrijos Poblacion School of Arts and Trades (TPSAT)

Secondary
Bonliw National High School
Malibago National High School
Maranlig National High School
Matuyatuya National High School
Poctoy National High School
Sibuyao National High School
Tigwi National High School
Our Mother of Perpetual Succor Academy

Primary

Tourism
 Torrijos White Beach (also known as Poctoy White Beach Resort, Barangay Poctoy)
 Battle of Pulang Lupa Monument (Barangay Bolo)
 Ka Amon Cave (Barangay Bonliw)
 Freedom Park (also known as Luneta Park, Barangay Poblacion)
 Sibuyao Farms
 Bonliw Loom Weaving (Barangay Bonliw)
 Tabag Cliff and River (Barangay Malibago)

References

External links
 [ Philippine Standard Geographic Code]
 
Philippine Census Information
Local Governance Performance Management System

Municipalities of Marinduque